Port Hills was a parliamentary electorate of New Zealand that existed for the 2008 through 2017 general elections. The Port Hills electorate was mostly urban, and lost the more rural Banks Peninsula areas of the old electorate to the Selwyn electorate that was also formed for the 2008 election.

Most of its area is now covered by the Banks Peninsula electorate.

Population centres
Port Hills was created after a review of electoral boundaries conducted in the wake of the 2006 census of population and dwellings. The bulk of Port Hills came from the old Banks Peninsula electorate, including the suburbs of Opawa and Woolston, the suburban areas around the Cashmere Hills, and the towns on the north coast of Lyttelton Harbour. The south Christchurch suburbs of Bromley and Sydenham have been added from Christchurch East and Wigram, respectively. Most of the electorate was urban.

The following suburbs, in alphabetical order, were at least partially located in the electorate: Balmoral Hill, Beckenham, Bromley, Cashmere, Cass Bay, Clifton, Corsair Bay, Ferrymead, Governors Bay, Heathcote Valley, Hillsborough, Huntsbury, Linwood, Lyttelton, Moncks Bay, Moncks Spur, Mount Pleasant, Murray Aynsley Hill, Opawa, Rapaki, Redcliffs, Richmond Hill, Scarborough, St Andrews Hill, St Martins, Sumner, Sydenham, Taylors Mistake, Waltham, and Woolston.

Port Hills was one of the electorates worst affected by the 2010 and 2011 earthquakes and suffered minor population loss as a result. The 2013 redistribution resulted in the electorate losing the areas around Bromley and Sydenham but regaining Halswell back from Selwyn.

Port Hills was abolished for the 2020 general election, being replaced largely by a recreated . This was to absorb population growth in neighbouring .

History
Because the new suburbs were strong Labour-voting areas, Banks Peninsula MP Ruth Dyson retained the electorate despite a nationwide swing to the National Party in 2008. This was also one of the electorates which elected a Labour MP but where the National Party won the party vote. National's candidate in 2008 was Terry Heffernan (1952–2010), who at that time was already weakened by cancer.

Based on preliminary counts, Dyson has a majority of 1,865 votes over Korako.

In the boundary review of 2019/2020, the Representation Commission decided to make large changes to the boundaries of Port Hills, taking area in Halswell and parts of Bromley out and adding Banks Peninsula in, to manage large changes in population in the Christchurch and  areas. The electorate was also re-recreated as Banks Peninsula.

Members of Parliament
Key

List MPs

Election results

2017 election

2014 election

2011 election

Electorate (as at 26 November 2011): 43,511

2008 election

Table footnotes

References

External links
 Port Hills Pulse website Labour party electorate website.
 Electorate Map from Elections NZ

Politics of Canterbury, New Zealand
Historical electorates of New Zealand
2008 establishments in New Zealand
Politics of Christchurch